DYHR (91.5 FM), broadcasting as 91.5 Yes The Best, is a radio station owned and operated by Manila Broadcasting Company through its licensee Cebu Broadcasting Company. The station's studio is located in Eggling Subd., Busay Hills, Cebu City, and its transmitter is located in Legacy Village, Brgy. Kalunasan, Cebu City. It operates 24 hours daily.

History
The station was established on January 1, 1999, as 91.5 Hot FM with the slogan "Today's Best Music". Its former studio and facilities were at the Cinco Centro Inn in Fuente Osmeña. It was among the top-rated station in the city from 1999 to 2002.

On February 24, 2014, the station, along with the other O&O Hot FM stations, rebranded as 91.5 Yes FM. This marked the return of the said branding in the market after five years. On May 1, 2017, following the launching of The new Face of YES!, it was rebranded as 91.5 Yes The Best, with its new slogan "The Millennials' Choice".

On November 15, 2021, Yes The Best along with sister stations launched their new logos and its new corporate slogan, Sama-Sama Tayo, Pilipino! (lit. We are all Filipinos!).

At the evening of December 16, 2021, the station went off the air after its studio in Eggling Subdivision and transmitter in Brgy. Kalunasan, both were destroyed by Typhoon Odette. Two weeks later, it went back on the air just in time for New Year's Day.

References

Radio stations in Metro Cebu
Radio stations established in 1999